Denisa Šátralová (née Allertová; born 7 March 1993) is an inactive Czech tennis player.

Šátralová has won nine singles and two doubles titles on the ITF Circuit in her career. On 21 March 2016, she reached her best singles ranking of world No. 55. On 1 August 2016, she peaked at No. 291 in the doubles rankings.

Playing for the Czech Republic Fed Cup team, she has a win–loss record of 1–0.

Personal life
Šátralová was born in Prague. In August 2019, she married her long time boyfriend Jan Šátral just outside Prague. On 18 November 2019 she switched to being named Denisa Šátralová.

Career

Grand Slam performance timeline

Singles

WTA career finals

Singles: 1 (runner–up)

ITF Circuit finals

Singles: 17 (10 titles, 7 runner–ups)

Doubles: 3 (2 titles, 1 runner–up)

Wins over top 10 players

References

External links

 
 
 

1993 births
Living people
Tennis players from Prague
Czech female tennis players
Tennis players at the 2010 Summer Youth Olympics